Jeremiah (c. 655–586 BCE) is one of the major prophets of the Hebrew Bible.

Jeremiah or Jeremias may also refer to:

 Book of Jeremiah, in Judeo-Christian scripture, including links to individual chapters

People
 Jeremiah (given name)
 Jeremiah (surname)
 Jeremiah (I), a first-generation Amora sage of the Land of Israel
 Jeremiah (II), a third-generation Amora sage of the Land of Israel
 Jeremiah (III), a fourth-generation Amora sage of the Land of Israel
 Jeremiah (Bulgarian priest), a 10th-century priest

Places
 Jeremiah, Kentucky

Titled works 
 Jeremiah (film), a 1998 Biblical film
 Jeremiah (play) (1919), by Stefan Zweig
 Jeremiah (comics), Belgian series since 1979
 Jeremiah (TV series) (2002–2004), in U.S, loosely based on the comic series
 Symphony No. 1 (Bernstein), composed in 1942 by Leonard Bernstein
 "Jeremiah", a song by Sara Groves from the 2004 album The Other Side of Something

See also
 Geremia
 Jeremiad, a prolonged lament or prophecy of doom
 Jeremías (born 1973), British-Venezuelan singer
 Jeremih (born 1987), an American singer, songwriter, rapper and record producer
 Old Jeremiah, antique British naval gun
 
 Jerry (given name)
 Jeremy (disambiguation)